Enneapterygius kosiensis is a species of triplefin blenny in the genus Enneapterygius. It was described by Wouter Holleman of the South African Institute for Aquatic Biodiversity in 2005. It has only been recorded from the coasts of the northern part of KwaZulu Natal in South Africa.

References

kosiensis
Taxa named by Wouter Holleman
Fish described in 2005